

Aldwulf or Ealdwulf (died 739) was a medieval Bishop of Rochester. He was probably consecrated in 727 and died in 739. According to Bede (Historia ecclesiastica 5.23) his consecrator was Archbishop Berctwald.

Citations

References

External links
 

Bishops of Rochester
8th-century English bishops
739 deaths
Year of birth unknown